May 2012

See also

References

 05
May 2012 events in the United States